is a private university in the city of Saku, Nagano, Japan. It was established in 2008.

References

External links
Saku University
 University guide
 Graduate School - Master of Science in Nursing
 Official website 

Educational institutions established in 2008
Private universities and colleges in Japan
Universities and colleges in Nagano Prefecture
Nursing schools in Japan
2008 establishments in Japan
Saku, Nagano